Malayala Masom Chingam Onnu is a 1996 Indian Malayalam-language film directed and produced by Nissar. The film stars Prem Kumar , Dileep, Biju Menon and Kalpana in the lead roles. The film has musical score by Raveendran.

Plot
The Plot revolves around Appu (Prem Kumar), his wife Renuka (Rudra), Renuka's friend Dr. Prasad (Biju Menon). Appu is a scrap dealer for whom Kochuraman (Harisree Ashokan) works. Renuka wants her husband to dress in a modern and stylish way according to new trends while Appu is the exact opposite. Preman (Dileep) is the neighbor of Appu and he is a photographer. Despite being a womanizer, he is married to Rukmini/Rukku (Kalpana) who suffers from stammering. Rukmini's father (Rajan P. Dev) is skeptical at first on his daughter's marriage to a womanizer but marries her to Preman thinking that her daughter would not get a good groom since she suffers from stammering. One day Dr. Prasad unexpectedly pays a visit to Renuka while Appu is at work. Preman parks his car in Appu's house due to lack of availability of parking space. On the day Prasad pays a visit, Preman enters to get his car and Renuka introduces Preman as her husband to Dr. Prasad. Preman plays along and when Prasad notices a picture of Renuka and Appu, Preman lies that Appu is her brother. Appu is unknown of these events. As the lie gets repeated more than once, Preman blackmails Renuka for sexual favours threatening to expose her lie. Whilst these, the pregnant Rukmini suffers a miscarriage which shatters Preman and he decides to turn a new leaf. Renuka attempts suicide on blackmail of Preman but survives. Riddled by fate, Preman leaves his womanizing tendencies turning into a faithful husband and Renuka leaves her attempt for modernizing her husband turning into a faithful wife.

Cast
Dileep as Preman
Prem Kumar as Appu
Rudra as Renuka
Biju Menon as Dr. Prasad
A. C. Zainuddin as Shersaab
Kalpana as Rukmini/Rukku
Manu Raj
Rajan P. Dev
Harishree Ashokan as Kochuraman
Philomina

Soundtrack
The music was composed by Raveendran and the lyrics were written by Gireesh Puthenchery.

References

External links
 

1996 films
1990s Malayalam-language films
Films directed by Nissar